The ICC EAP Cricket Trophy is a regional division of the ICC World Cricket League, providing opportunities for cricket playing nations in the East-Asia Pacific Region to compete against one another. It also acts as the regional qualifier for entry into the World Cricket League.

Tournaments

List A

The ICC EAP Cricket Trophy (One day) is the Limited overs cricket format of the ICC EAP Cricket Trophy.

Twenty20

2009
This was the first time that Twenty20 games were played in the EAP trophy. The matches were held from 17–18 September with the eight teams being split into two groups of four in which each team played the other three. The play-offs were based on the final standings from the group stage. The final was between Papua New Guinea and Fiji and Papua New Guinea won comfortably.

2011
Division Two
Division Two of the 2011 EAP Trophy was held in Apia, Samoa from 2–8 April. The tournament was a Twenty20 competition. After a round robin group stage of five matches each, Samoa easily beat the Philippines in the final, winning the tournament and promotion to Division One.

Division One
Division One of the 2011 EAP Trophy is due to be held in Papua New Guinea in July, with the winner due to progress to the 2012 ICC World Twenty20 Qualifier, the final qualification tournament for the 2012 ICC World Twenty20 due to be held in Sri Lanka.

Tournament results

References

See also
 Cricket World Cup
 International Cricket Council

 
International cricket competitions
Cricket in Asia
Cricket in Oceania
Oceanian championships
Recurring sporting events established in 2009